Midwin Charles (July 17, 1973 – April 6, 2021) was a Haitian-American defense attorney.

Early life
Charles was born on July 17, 1973, in Brooklyn, New York, where she was raised, before becoming a graduate of Syracuse University with a bachelor's degree, moving on to earn a Juris Doctor degree at the American University Washington College of Law.

Career
Charles was the founder of the Midwin Charles & Associates LLC law firm. She was prominent as a television personality, being the legal analyst for American television channels CNN and MSNBC. She also commented on Bloomberg TV, HLN and TV One, and her topics included such other broad subjects as pop culture and politics.

Death
Charles died on April 6, 2021, her family announced on Twitter.

References

1973 births
2021 deaths
American people of Haitian descent
Lawyers from Brooklyn
Television personalities from New York City
CNN people
MSNBC people
Syracuse University alumni
Washington College of Law alumni
Place of death missing